The Roman Catholic Diocese of Sainte-Anne-de-la-Pocatière (erected 23 June 1951) is a suffragan of the Archdiocese of Quebec.

Bishops

Ordinaries
Bruno Desrochers (1951 - 1968)
Charles Henri Lévesque (1968 - 1984)
André Gaumond (1985 - 1995), appointed Coadjutor Archbishop of Sherbrooke, Québec
Clément Fecteau (1996 - 2008)
Yvon-Joseph Moreau (2008 - 2017)
Pierre Goudreault (2017–present)

Auxiliary bishops
 Louis Joseph Jean Marie Fortier (1960-1965), appointed Bishop of Gaspé, Québec
 Charles Henri Lévesque (1965-1968), appointed Bishop of this diocese

Other priest of this diocese who became bishop
 Dorylas Moreau, appointed Bishop of  Rouyn-Noranda, Québec in 2001

Bibliography

External links
Official Site

Sainte-Anne-de-la-Pocatiere
Christian organizations established in 1951
Roman Catholic dioceses and prelatures established in the 20th century
La Pocatière
1951 establishments in Quebec